The Extreme Sports Channel is a pay television channel that was launched from Amsterdam on 1 May 1999. The channel broadcasts in over 60 countries and 12 languages, and covers extreme sport and adventure sports which include surfing, skateboarding, snowboarding, wakeboarding, motocross, BMX, mountain biking, FMX, music, gaming and fashion.

The vision and idea for the Extreme brand franchise and TV channel came from Alistair Gosling, founder of Extreme International, an ambassador for action and adventure sports, supporter of several global marine conservation projects, international advisory board member of Qiddiya, ة القدية للاستثمار  the 334-square-km sports, entertainment and cultural destination being developed in the Kingdom of Saudi Arabia and is a supporter of Medshr.net the award winning medical network that is helping save lives through peer to peer learning between doctors.

History
In 1997 Alistair Gosling, founder of Extreme, started approaching potential investors to back the plan for a new brand and TV network dedicated to extreme and adventure sports. UPCtv, the programming arm of Europe's largest cable television operator UPC, was looking for new channels to offer its subscribers and in April 1998 Extreme international was exhibiting at the MIP programming market in Cannes, France, Ben Barrett the sales director was approached by Stephen Cohen, UPCtv's Chief Operating Officer, with a proposal for a joint venture between the two companies. Extreme partnered with UPC and the Extreme Sports Channel was launched from the Netherlands on 1 May 1999, and in the UK in 2000. The channel was designed by Gosling and Cohen, management and content was delivered by Extreme International, technical play out and uplink were supplied by UPC.

In late 1999, Extreme launched its United States operations, and charged veteran producer, Lloyd Bryan Adams with the task of heading up the North American presence. They launched EXtreme TV, a branded block on Fox Sports Net in March 2012.

In 2005, after launching the channel in over sixty countries, and seeing the growth in digital coming Extreme International acquired the Extreme brand and sold its 50% stake in Extreme Sports Channel to John Malone's Liberty Global Inc. which had by then become owner of UPC. The channel was put under the management of Chellomedia. Since the transaction and as the sector and the sports have rapidly grown and moved into the mainstream Extreme has expanded globally. Driven by the Vision to Drive positive change through extreme and adventure sports, Extremes integrated offer encompasses strategy, design, development, and management of adventure based destinations, hotels and resorts,  events, social media publishing and marketing services. The organisation operates around three guiding pillars, people, planet, and place, are headquartered in London, and serves clients through its experienced international team. 

Extreme destinations division is designing developing and starting to operate, hotels, resorts and adventure parks and offers adventure consulting services that cover advice, strategy, planning, development and operations across extreme and adventure sports tourism and destination projects.

Extreme Events is growing and managing a portfolio of events, conferences and shows for millennials oriented around "adventure sports" and "environmental action" markets like the Extreme Hangout in the environmental action events platform that was launched at COP 28 in Glasgow.

In media it operates social media publishing division posting and producing brand defining action and adventure sports, travel and lifestyle entertainment daily and offers Social media management, content creation, advertising and sponsorship solutions for brands, events and destinations. The collection of social and digital channels delivers content how, when and where viewers want it and are accessed through all social media networks, connected TV platforms and mobile apps.With a global community of approaching 20 million fans, its hits over 200m video views every month and recorded more than 2 billion video views in 2022. 

Across everything Extreme does it works to sustainably drive sport participation, an active and healthy lifestyle, job creation, infrastructure investment and tourism. Whilst aligning with five key United Nations Sustainable Development Goals and government agendas there is a commitment to be sustainable, and have launched the Extreme Hangout an impact platform, are signed up to Planet Mark to measure impact, 1% For The Planet to give back and the UN’s Sports for Climate Action to drive awareness.

The channel launched in Poland in January 2006, followed by France in that same year.

The UK version of the channel was free-to-air from launch until the summer of 2006, when a deal with BSkyB meant that it became encrypted.

On 28 September 2011 the channel began broadcasting in widescreen (16:9) format.

On 1 February 2012 the high-definition version of the channel began broadcasting in Italy.

AMC Networks acquired Chellomedia on 2 February 2014. Chellomedia was rebranded by AMC Networks International on 8 July 2014.

On 31 December 2015, the channel was removed from the Sky EPG.

As of 27 October 2021 Extreme is available on Channelbox on Freeview channel 271 in the UK. Channelbox is a free IPTV service available to any Freeview compatible device that can connect to both an aerial and internet.

External links
  (TV channel)
  (Extreme International - Founders)

References

Television channels in the Netherlands
AMC Networks International
Sports television channels in the United Kingdom
Sports television in Poland
Sports television in North Macedonia
Television channels in North Macedonia
Television channels and stations established in 1999